The "Two Whatevers" refers to the statement that "We will resolutely uphold whatever policy decisions Chairman Mao made, and unswervingly follow whatever instructions Chairman Mao gave".

This statement was contained in a joint editorial, entitled "Study the Documents Well and Grasp the Key Link", printed on 7 February 1977 in People's Daily, the journal Red Flag and the PLA Daily.

Content 
The policy was advocated by the Chinese Communist Party chairman Hua Guofeng, Mao's successor, who had earlier ended the Cultural Revolution and arrested the Gang of Four. However, this policy proved unpopular with Deng Xiaoping and other party leaders advocating market reform.

It proved a trigger for Deng's manoeuvre in 1978 to gain control of economic policy in China, and led eventually to Hua being demoted from the party leadership in 1980.

The coalition of Hua's political supporters, referred to as the "whateverist faction", also lost its power after Deng's political manoeuvre: Wang Dongxing, Ji Dengkui, Wu De, and Chen Xilian, the so-called "Little Gang of Four", were relieved of all their Party and state posts during the 5th Plenum of the 11th Central Committee of the CCP, 23–29 February 1980.

References

Cultural Revolution
Ideology of the Chinese Communist Party
1977 in China
People's Daily